Glory Train: Songs of Faith, Worship, and Praise is the seventeenth studio album released by American country music artist Randy Travis. It is his fifth album of gospel music and his fifth release for Word Records. The album comprises nineteen covers of traditional and contemporary gospel songs. No singles were released from it.

Track listing
"This Train" (Sister Rosetta Tharpe) – 3:40
"Swing Down Chariot" (traditional) – 3:12
"Precious Memories" (Tharpe) – 4:13
"Shout to the Lord" (Darlene Zschech) – 4:21
"Down by the Riverside" (Tharpe) – 3:06
"Nothing but the Blood" (Robert Lowry) – 2:32
"Were You There?" (traditional) – 3:52
"Up Above My Head (I Hear Music in the Air)" (Tharpe) – 2:55
"He's Got the Whole World in His Hands" (traditional) – 2 :19
"Heart of Worship" (Matt Redman) – 3:53
"Jesus on the Main Line" (traditional) – 2:31
"Through the Fire" (Gerald Crabb) – 3:27
"Here I Am to Worship" (Tim Hughes) – 3:59
"Oh Death" (Crabb) – 2:46
"Nobody Knows, Nobody Cares" (Tharpe) – 3:11
"Since Jesus Came into My Heart" (Charles H. Gabriel, Rufus H. Gabriel) – 3:23
"Oh How I Love Jesus" (Frederick Whitfield) – 2:45
"Are You Washed in the Blood" (traditional) – 3:08
"Precious Lord, Take My Hand" (Thomas A. Dorsey) – 3:21

Personnel

 Al Anderson - acoustic guitar
 Larry Beaird - acoustic guitar
 The Blind Boys of Alabama - background vocals (2, 8)
 Sidney Cox - background vocals
 Suzanne Cox - background vocals
 The Crabb Family - background vocals (12)
 Dennis Crouch - upright bass
 Eric Darken - bells, cajón, chimes, clay drums, cymbals, djembe, bass drum, snare drum, hand drums, jews harp, shaker, tambourine, timpani, vibraphone
 Billy Davis - background vocals
 Chip Davis - background vocals
 Craig Duncan - Hammer Dulcimer
 Connie Ellisor - violin
 Larry Franklin - fiddle, mandolin
 Paul Franklin - pedabro
 Carl Gorodetzky - string contractor, violin
 Jim Grosjean - viola
 Pastor Matthew Hagee - background vocals
 Vicki Hampton - background vocals
 Tony Harrell - accordion, harmonium
 Wes Hightower - background vocals
 Kirk "Jelly Roll" Johnson - harmonica, bass harmonica
 Christina Ketterling - background vocals
 Randy Kohrs - dobro
 Anthony LaMarchina - cello
 Brent Mason - acoustic guitar, gut string guitar
 Lisa Silver - background vocals
 Pam Sixfin - violin
 Bryan Sutton - Archguitar, banjo, 12-string guitar, acoustic guitar, resonator guitar, hi-string acoustic guitar, mandolin, soloist
 Randy Travis - lead vocals
 Cindy Richardson-Walker - background vocals
 Bergen White - string arrangements
 Kris Wilkinson - viola
 Casey Wood - bells, snare drum, hi-hat, tambourine

Charts

Weekly charts

Year-end charts

Awards

In 2006, the album won a Dove Award for Country Album of the Year at the 37th GMA Dove Awards.

References

[ Glory Train] at allmusic

2005 albums
Randy Travis albums
Word Records albums
Albums produced by Kyle Lehning